The Hatteras Beacon was a small lighthouse at Cape Point near Cape Hatteras, North Carolina.  It was attached to the Cape Hatteras Light Station.

History
The beacon was established in 1855, and was moved several times over the course of its career; due to its exposed position, it took the brunt of many storms that blew in from the Atlantic Ocean.  It was a short, square tower constructed of wood.   Little else is known about it, except that it was the responsibility of the Third Assistant Keeper at Cape Hatteras, working under the head keeper's supervision.

Tilman Smith, head keeper at Cape Hatteras from 1887 to 1897, is recorded as having lit the tower for the last time in November, 1898, after which it was shut and replaced by a small post light at the point.  No trace of the lighthouse survives today.

Lighthouses in North Carolina
Lighthouses completed in 1855
Buildings and structures in Dare County, North Carolina